Olga Andreyevna Zhizneva (Russian: Ольга Андреевна Жизнева; April 17, 1899November 10, 1972) was a Soviet and Russian stage and film actress. People's Artist of the RSFSR (1969).

Selected filmography
Property of the Republic (1971) as Princess Tikhvinskaya
Late Flowers (1969) as Princess Priklonskaya
We'll Live Till Monday (1968) as Melnikov's Mother
The Shield and the Sword (1968) as baroness
 An Unusual Summer (1957) as Vera Izvekova
Admiral Ushakov (1953) as Empress Catherine II of Russia
The Foundling (1939) as Natasha's mother
The Three Million Trial (1926) as the banker's wife
His Call (1925) as Lulu
The Tailor from Torzhok (1925) as young lady

See also
Vera Kholodnaya
Igor Ilyinsky
Anel Sudakevich

External links

1899 births
1972 deaths
20th-century Russian actresses
Actresses from Saint Petersburg
Honored Artists of the RSFSR
People's Artists of the RSFSR
Stalin Prize winners
Recipients of the Order of the Red Banner of Labour
Russian film actresses
Russian silent film actresses
Russian stage actresses
Soviet film actresses
Soviet silent film actresses
Soviet stage actresses

Burials at Vvedenskoye Cemetery